Pittsburgh and Castle Shannon Plane was a  narrow gauge incline railway that ran from the northern end of the Pittsburgh and Castle Shannon Tunnel to Carson Street in Pittsburgh, Pennsylvania.   Originally built to carry coal from the Jacob Beltzhoover mine, it was sold by the Pittsburgh Coal Company  to the Pittsburgh and Castle Shannon Railroad in 1871. It was used only for coal as early as 1864, passenger traffic was added in 1874 for the Pittsburgh and Castle Shannon Railroad.  For safety reasons, the tunnel was closed to passenger traffic, and passengers were diverted to the Castle Shannon Incline, constructed in 1890. Emergency use of the plane for passengers and freight continued as late as 1900.  Its use for the transport of passengers and freight other than coal was made obsolete by the Mount Washington Transit Tunnel.  Operation as a coal incline continued until May 1, 1912.
It was operated as a gravity plane, with returning empty cars being pulled to the mine mouth by the weight of the descending full coal cars.

References

Railway inclines in Pittsburgh
Defunct funicular railways in the United States
History of Allegheny County, Pennsylvania
Defunct Pennsylvania railroads
Narrow gauge railroads in Pennsylvania
3 ft 4 in gauge railways in the United States
1912 disestablishments in Pennsylvania